Natatolana oculata is a species of crustacean in the family Cirolanidae, and was first described by Ernst Vanhöffen in 1914 as Cirolana oculata. It was redescribed as Natatolana oculata by Stephen Keable in 2006.

It is a benthic species, living at depths of 43 - 840  m and is found in the waters of the Antarctic. It is a scavenger.

References

External links
Natatolana oculata Occurrence data from GBIF

Cymothoida
Taxa named by Ernst Vanhöffen
Crustaceans described in 1914